Raja Mir Syed Muhammad Baquar Ali Khan Bahadur (1842–1902) C.I.E., The Mir of Kotaha and the Raja of Morni and Pindrawal, was a noted zamindar and philanthropist from Morni who lived in Pindrawal in United Province of British India.

Early life
He was born in year 1842 in the noted Lalkhani branch of Muslim Rajputs. He was born to Quasim Ali Khan aka Kasim Ali Khan and Latif-ul-nissa. His father, Quasim Ali was son of Mir Akbar Ali, the Mir of Kotaha, while his mother was granddaughter of Raja Nahar Ali Khan and daughter of Akbar Ali Khan of Pindrawal.

Mir of Kotaha
His grandfather Akbar Ali was the jagirdar of Kotaha (Kutaya), usually spoken of as the Mir of Kotaha, and enjoyed also a perpetual pension of Rs. 400 a year, granted in 1850, in return for the surrender of the right to levy transit duties within the limits of the Morni tract. His father Qasim Ali Khan II had died at Lahore in 1849-50. His grandfather, Meer Akbar Ali Khan had come under suspicion of British during Revolt of 1857 and Thomas Douglas Forsyth, Deputy Commissioner Umballa partially dismantled the Kotaha fort. The successor to him Melville was a bit lenient on Mir of Kotaha and taking advantage of this Akbar Ali rebuilt the fort without permission. But  when James Stuart Tighe also known as Captain Tighe succeeded P. S. Melville as the Deputy Commissioner of Umballa in 1864 and the Mir came under the severe displeasure of the British Government on a charge of conspiracy, and ‘on an attempt to partially rebuild his fort at Kotaha without permission’. This led to demolition of fort  and confiscation of their jagir. However, meanwhile,  Meer Akbar Ali died in 1864 and young Bakir Ali succeeded him as Mir of Kotaha.  Due to his young age he was spared and their jagir of Kotaha was restored to him but at the same time, he was banished from town.  However, his whole property in Naraingarh was brought under direct official management. The Government cancelled the sentence of banishment and the property was finally restored to the Mir in 1880.

Raja of Pindrawal
After death of his grandfather, Baqar Ali Khan II, inherited the title of Mir of Kotaha but due to banishment settled at Pindrawal in the Bulandshahr district of the North-West Provinces, where he had  inherited a large zamindari property consisting of 365 villages, from her maternal side and was later given the title of Raja of Pindrawal.  He also inherited large estates in Koil, Khair and Atrauli parganas of Aligarh district and Morthal estates in Budaun district.

Philanthropist and educationist
Raja Mir Syed Muhammad Baqar Ali Khan II, was one of the visionaries, who understood the value of education for up-liftment of Muslim community. He heartily co-operated with Sir Syed Ahmad Khan in the foundation of the Muhammadan Anglo-Oriental College he was the founder vice president and also the board of trustee of the Muhammadan Anglo-Oriental College  and he also donated a substantial amount of money to build Muhammadan Anglo-Oriental College at Aligarh. He also donated Rs. 30,000 towards the construction of the Bulandshahr Town Hall.

He was also a fellow of the Society of Arts, Great Britain.

Honors
He was given title of Khan Bahadur and later created a Companion of the Most Eminent Order of the Indian Empire, on 1 January 1883 by the British government in recognition of his services.

Death

Raja Mir Syed Muhammad Baquar Ali Khan II of Morni, Kotaha and Pindrawal died on 20 January 1902.

Family
 Raja Mir Syed Muhammad Baquar Ali Khan died leaving two sons Raja Mir Syed Muhammad Jafar Ali Khan and Kunwar Asghar Ali Khan. He was succeeded by the elder
 Raja Mir Syed Muhammad Jafar Ali Khan II, who built a fort at Atrauli, Aligarh district in 1909 that stands to date.
 Kunwar Mir Syed Muhammad Asghar Ali Khan founded the Asgharabad Estate after the partition of Pindrawal Estate.
 Raja Mir Syed Muhammad Jafar Ali Khan II was succeeded by his son
 Raja Mir Syed Muhammad Akbar Ali Khan II, O.B.E. (1896-1958) who became a member of the UP Legislative council in 1937.  He was accorded kalgi and khilat by the Governor of Punjab in a special durbar at Sirhind. He had also inherited the family estates at Teori and Morthal, Uttar Pradesh. He built a hospital at Morni. Akbar Ali Khan also donated fund to start a scholarship at Aligarh Muslim University Raja Mir Syed Muhammad Akbar Ali Khan was succeeded by his three sons Raja Mir Syed Muhammad Qasim Ali Khan, Raja Mir Syed Muhammad Qazim Ali Khan and Raja Mir Syed Muhammad Raza Ali Khan.
 Raja Mir Syed Muhammad Qasim Ali Khan had five sons and was succeeded by his elder son
 Rajazaada Mir Syed Muhammad Baqir Ali Khan III who was succeeded by his three sons
 Kunwar Mir Syed Muhammad Abul Hasan who is  succeeded by his two sons
 Kunwarzaada Mir Syed Musa Ali 
 Kunwarzaada Mir Syed Hamza Ali.
 Kunwar Mir Syed Muhammad Ali who is succeeded by his son
 Kunwarzaada Mir Syed Shahrome Ali.
 Kunwar Mir Syed Muhammad Hasan who is succeeded by his son 
 Kunwarzaada Mir Syed Muhammad Mahdi.
 Raja Mir Syed Muhammad Qazim Ali Khan had 3 sons and was succeeded by his elder son 
 Rajazaada Mir Syed Muhammad Mustafa Ali Khan who is succeeded by his son
 Kunwar Mir Syed Muhammad Saif Mustafa.
 Raja Mir Syed Muhammad Raza Ali khan is succeeded by his six sons
 Rajazaada Mir Syed Muhammad Ali Khan who is succeeded by his son
 Kunwar Mir Syed Muhammad Hasan Ali who is succeeded by his son 
 Kunwarzaada Mir Syed Muhammad Zidan Ali.
 Rajazaada Mir Syed Muhammad Ahmad Ali Khan who is succeeded by his two sons
 Kunwar Mir Syed Muhammad Hani Raza
 Kunwar Mir Syed Muhammad Ali Raza.
 Rajazaada Mir Syed Muhammad Mustafa Ali Khan who is succeeded by his three sons
 Kunwar Mir Syed Muhammad Moosi Raza
 Kunwar Mir Syed Muhammad Sadiq Ali Khan
 Kunwar Mir Syed Muhammad Baquar Ali Khan IV.
 Rajazaada Mir Syed Muhammad Mujtaba Ali Khan who is succeeded by his son 
 Kunwar Mir Syed Muhammad Abdullah Raza.
 Rajazaada Mir Syed Muhammad Murtaza Ali Khan who died in 1986 without an heir.
 Rajazaada Mir Syed Muhammad Haider Ali Khan who is succeeded by his two sons 
 Kunwar Mir Syed Muhammad Murtaza Raza
 Kunwar Mir Syed Muhammad Raza.

References

Further reading
History of Morni tracts

1842 births
1902 deaths
Indian royalty
People from Bulandshahr district
Companions of the Order of the Indian Empire
People from Ambala district
19th-century Indian philanthropists
Aligarh Muslim University
Khan Bahadurs